Hilmar Meincke Krohg (1 January 1776 – 13 August 1851) was a Norwegian politician and elected official. He served as a representative at the Norwegian Constitutional Assembly.

Biography
Hilmar Meincke Krohg was born in Trondheim, Norway. He attended the Trondheim Cathedral School and later earned his law degree in 1799 at the University of Copenhagen. He was appointed district governor in Finnmark in 1811. He was subsequently transferred to Nordre Bergenhus Amt (now Sogn og Fjordane), but before he could take office, he was appointed to be the County Governor of Romsdals Amt (now Møre og Romsdal), a position he held until 1840.
 
He was a member of the Norwegian Constitutional Assembly at Eidsvoll in 1814, where he joined the independence party (Selvstendighetspartiet).
He was also elected to the first session of the Norwegian Parliament in 1814. He was later elected in 1824 and 1830, representing the constituency of Romsdals Amt.

Personal life
In 1803, he married Cecilia Edel Sophie Stub (1786–1864). They were the parents of nine children.

Honors
Krogh was awarded the Order of the Dannebrog, Order of the Polar Star and Order of Vasa

References

Related Reading
Holme Jørn (2014) De kom fra alle kanter - Eidsvollsmennene og deres hus (Oslo: Cappelen Damm) 

1776 births
1851 deaths
Politicians from Trondheim
Order of the Dannebrog
Order of the Polar Star
Order of Vasa
University of Copenhagen alumni
Fathers of the Constitution of Norway
Members of the Storting
County governors of Norway
Møre og Romsdal politicians